Chuck, Charlie or Charles Stewart may refer to:

Academics
Charles Stewart (orientalist) (1764–1837), British author, translator and scholar
Charles Stewart (zoologist) (1840–1907), English comparative anatomist and lecturer
Charles Hunter Stewart (1854–1924), Scottish physician, public health expert and professor
Charles Stewart III, American author and professor of political science at MIT since 1985

Military officers
Charles Stewart (British Army officer) (1775–1812), battalion commander who died in Napoleonic wars
Charles Stewart (American Navy officer) (1778–1869), ship captain in War of 1812
Charles Seaforth Stewart (1823–1904), American Civil War colonel in Army Corps of Engineers

Performers
Charles Henry Hylton Stewart, English clergyman and organist
Charles Hylton Stewart (1884–1932), his son, English cathedral organist
Charles Stewart (actor) (1923–2016), American performer and tennis player
Charles Stewart (rapper) (born 1971), American performer; stage name Chali 2na

Politicians
Charles Stewart, 3rd Duke of Richmond (1639–1672), English peer; sat in Convention Parliament
Charles Stewart (Royal Navy officer) (1681–1741), English military and political figure
Charles Stewart, Irish MP for Cavan County during 1783–87 and 1790–93
Charles Stewart (New Jersey politician) (1729–1800), American Continental Congress delegate, 1784–85
Charles Stewart (bishop) (1775–1837), Church of England clergyman, bishop and Lower Canada politician
Charles William Stewart (1778–1854), Irish soldier in British Army; later Charles William Vane, 3rd Marquess of Londonderry
Charles Bellinger Stewart (1806–1885), American political leader in Texas Republic
Charles Stewart (Harris County politician) (1836–1895), American state senator from Texas, 1879–1883
Charles Stewart (Australian politician) (1844–1919), member of Tasmanian Parliament
Charles H. Stewart (1867–1936), American mayor of Melbourne, Florida (1890–1891, 1902–1905)
Charles Stewart (premier) (1868–1946), Canadian premier of Alberta, 1917–1921
Charles Wallace Stewart (1885–1948), Canadian Member of Parliament for Humboldt, Saskatchewan
Charles Stewart (Wainwright MLA) (1917–1991), Canadian Member of Alberta Legislative Assembly, 1975–1982
Charles Stewart (Northern Ireland politician), Northern Ireland House of Commons independent member, 1958–1966
Charles D. Stewart (1919–1986), American politician from Florida

Sportsmen

Footballers
Charlie Stewart (footballer, born 1880) (1880–1957), Australian full-forward and World War I veteran
Charlie Stewart (footballer, born c. 1910) (c. 1910–after 1964), Australian rules player and coach
Charlie Stewart (soccer, born 1928), Australian association player
Charlie Stewart (footballer, born 1939), Australian wingman and coach
Charlie Stewart (Scottish footballer), outside left during late 1950s early 1960s

Other sportsmen
Charles Stewart (sport shooter) (1881–1965), English Olympic sport shooter
Charles Stewart (ice hockey) (1895–1973), Canadian goaltender for Boston Bruins, 1924–27
Charles Stewart (rugby union) (1860–1890), Scottish rugby union player
Charlie Stewart (rugby union) (1936–1998), Scottish rugby union player

Others
Charles Stewart (customs official), Scottish-born American merchant in 1772 Somersett Case
Charles Stewart, 7th Earl of Traquair (1746–1827), Scottish landowner
Charles Stewart (diplomat) (1907–1979), British ambassador to Iceland and Libya
Charles E. Stewart Jr. (1916–1994), American federal judge
Chuck Stewart (1927–2017), American photographer of jazz singers and musicians
Charles Stewart (minister) (born 1946), Church of Scotland priest
Charles Henry Stewart (1824–1894), Ceylon judge
Charles J. Stewart (business), chairman of Manufacturers Hanover Trust Company

Places
Mount Charles Stewart, in Canada's Banff National Park

See also
Charles Stuart (disambiguation)
Charles Vane-Tempest-Stewart (disambiguation)